Cacioricotta is a typical southern-Italian cheese produced in the regions of Basilicata, Apulia, and Calabria.

Production Method 
Cacioricotta is produced with a "hybrid" method of preparation, following both the steps used in the production of Ricotta as well as hard paste cheese. The cheese is usually made with sheep or goat milk, and more rarely with cow milk and water buffalo milk.

To manufacture the cheese filtered milk is heated up until it reaches its boiling point; the liquid is then left to cool until it reaches a temperature of 38-40°, rennet is then added. Due to the liquid reaching a temperature close to 90° whilst reaching its boiling point curd as well as casein and albumin are integrated within the liquid, unlike ricotta where whey becomes a by-product.

Acknowledgements and regional differences 
Cacioricotta is recognised as a prodotto agroalimentare tradizionale (PAT), and has the following variants in these Italian regions:

 Basilicata

 cacioricotta

 Calabria

 cacioricotta

 Campania

 cacioricotta di capra cilentana

 Lazio

 cacioricotta di bufala

 Apulia

 Cacioricotta salentino

References

Related Articles 

 Cacioricotta pugliese
 Cacioricotta di capra cilentana

External Links 

 
 
 
Lucanian cheeses
Italian cheeses
Italian cuisine